Kado may refer to:

 Kadu people
 Ikebana, also known as Kadō, Japanese flower arrangement
 Kado, Kalewa, Burma
 Kado, Togo
 KADO-CD, a low-power television station (channel 36, virtual 40) licensed to serve Shreveport, Louisiana, United States
 Kado or Ka-do, an island in North Korea
 Kado: The Right Answer, anime

See also
 Caddo, a people of southeast US.